HMS Nottingham was a  light cruiser built for the Royal Navy just before World War I. She was one of three ships of the Birmingham sub-class and was completed in early 1914. The ship was assigned to the 1st Light Cruiser Squadron (LCS) of the Home and Grand Fleets for her entire career. Nottingham participated in most of the early fleet actions, including the battles of Heligoland Bight, Dogger Bank, and Jutland, helping to sink several German ships during the battles. The ship was sunk by the German submarine  during the Action of 19 August 1916.

Design and description
The Town-class cruisers were intended to protect British merchant shipping from attack by enemy cruisers. The Birminghams were a slightly larger and improved version of the preceding Chatham sub-class with a more powerful armament. The ships had a crew of 480 officers and other ranks.

Their main armament consisted of nine BL 6-inch  Mk XII guns in single mounts. Two of these were mounted on the forward of the bridge, abreast of each other; six guns were positioned amidships, three on each broadside, and the last gun was fitted on the centreline. During 1915 a QF  20-cwt anti-aircraft gun was added aft of the rear funnel. The Birminghams were also armed with a pair of submerged  torpedo tubes, one on each side, for which they carried a total of seven torpedoes.

Construction and career
Nottingham, the third ship of her name to serve in the Royal Navy, was named after the eponymous city. She was laid down on 13 June 1912, launched on 18 April 1913 and completed in April 1914. Upon commissioning that same month, the ship was assigned to the 1st LCS, together with both of her sisters. On 24 June, Nottingham was one of seven warships from the Royal Navy present in Kiel, Germany, to celebrate the re-opening of the Kiel Canal.

A few weeks after the start of World War I on 4 August, the Admiralty decided to attack German patrols in the Heligoland Bight on 28 August with the destroyers and cruisers of the Harwich Force and a flotilla of submarines. Despite some confusion at the highest levels of the Admiralty, Admiral John Jellicoe, commander of the Grand Fleet, dispatched the 1st LCS and five of his battlecruisers to reinforce the Harwich Force. During the battle, Nottingham helped to sink the light cruiser  and was not damaged herself. Several months later, the Germans bombarded Scarborough, Hartlepool and Whitby on 16 December and the 1st LCS was escorting Vice-Admiral David Beatty's battlecruisers in response when it encountered a German light cruiser and a half-flotilla of torpedo boats. Nottingham was not in range to engage before the squadron turned away to follow the battlecruisers. During the Battle of Dogger Bank, the ship helped to sink the armoured cruiser  on 23 January 1915. After the battle, the squadron helped to escort the crippled battlecruiser  home. Shortly after the battle, Nottingham and her sisters were transferred to the 2nd Light Cruiser Squadron by 18 March, although the squadron was also assigned to Beatty's battlecruisers. On 18 June 1915, the ship was detached to reinforce the 3rd Cruiser Squadron during a patrol across the North Sea.

Battle of Jutland

Almost a year later, the ship participated in the Battle of Jutland on 31 May–1 June 1916. The 2nd LCS screened the battlecruisers during the battle. Nottingham helped to repel an attack by German torpedo boats around 16:26 during the first phase of the battle, the "Run to the South". After spotting the main German battlefleet at 16:30, the 2nd LCS followed the Beatty's ships in a turn to the north fifteen minutes later. During the turn and afterwards, they were fired upon by eleven German battleships at very long range without significant effect. Their late turn meant that they now trailed Beatty's battlecruisers and were now even with the battleships of the attached 5th Battle Squadron by about 18:50. About 10 minutes later, the 2nd LCS engaged the crippled light cruiser , but were forced to disengage by the German battleships and took up station at the rear of the Grand Fleet. About a half-hour later, they fired at the disabled torpedo boat .

Around nightfall, the squadron attacked a group of three German torpedo boats without apparent effect at 20:52, although one ship had a boiler knocked out. Less than two hours later, the squadron encountered the seven light cruisers of German 4th Scouting Group at very close range in the darkness. Nottingham was not hit during the engagement, but the squadron flagship, her half-sister , was extensively damaged and sank one of the opposing cruisers. The squadron returned home the next day without further excitement. Nottingham was not hit during the battle and expended 136 six-inch shells and one torpedo.

Action of 19 August 1916

On the evening of 18 August, the Grand Fleet put to sea in response to a message deciphered by Room 40 that indicated that the High Seas Fleet, minus II Squadron, would be leaving harbour that night. The German objective was to bombard Sunderland the following day, based on extensive reconnaissance conducted by Zeppelins and submarines. Part of the German plan was to draw the British ships through a series of submarine ambushes and Nottingham fell victim to one of the awaiting U-boats, U-52, about 06:00 the following morning. The submarine was spotted about a half-hour prior despite the morning haze, but she was believed to be a small fishing boat and disregarded. U-52 initially hit the cruiser with two torpedoes that knocked out all power, but Nottingham was not in danger of sinking until she was hit with another torpedo 25 minutes later. Her half-sister  had reported the first attack; in response, Beatty dispatched two destroyers to render assistance and they arrived about 10 minutes before Nottingham sank at 07:10. The ship lost 38 crewmen in the attack.

The Union Jack flown by the ship hangs at Jutland in St Mary's Church, Nottingham. It was presented by Admiral Sir William George Tennant. In December 1993, during a ceremony at Emden, Germany, Flottillenadmiral Otto H. Ciliax of the Federal German Navy presented the commanding officer of the latest HMS Nottingham with a boat's badge and ensign from the cruiser sunk in 1916, as a gesture of goodwill and reconciliation. Admiral Ciliax's father, Otto Ciliax, was the executive officer of U-52; he recovered these items off a lifeboat from the ship while picking up survivors.

Notes

Citations

Bibliography

External links
Ships of the Birmingham group
Battle of Jutland Crew Lists Project - HMS Nottingham Crew List

 

Town-class cruisers (1910) of the Royal Navy
Ships built in Pembroke Dock
1913 ships
World War I cruisers of the United Kingdom
Ships sunk by German submarines in World War I
World War I shipwrecks in the North Sea
Maritime incidents in 1916